Organization of Iranian People's Fedai Guerrillas – Followers of the Identity Platform is an Iranian communist group, based in exile. It was formed in 1983, as a split from the Organization of Iranian People's Fedai Guerrillas (Minority).

See also

References

External links

Communist parties in Iran
Banned communist parties
Banned political parties in Iran
National Council of Resistance of Iran
Political organizations based in France